Stenoptilia parnasia is a moth of the family Pterophoridae. It is found in Greece, Turkey, Armenia, Turkmenistan and Iran.

References

parnasia
Moths described in 1986
Plume moths of Asia
Plume moths of Europe
Taxa named by Ernst Arenberger